Wappapello is an unincorporated community in southeastern Wayne County, Missouri, United States. It is located approximately thirteen miles northeast of Poplar Bluff, next to Lake Wappapello.

Wappapello was laid out in 1884 when the railroad was extended to that point.  The community has the name of a Native American chieftain. A post office called Wappapello has been in operation since 1884.

References

Wappapello was founded by Samuel R. Kelley, a veteran of the Civil War.  He was originally from Ohio, saw the Wappapello area as a young Union soldier, and homesteaded land there after the war.

Unincorporated communities in Wayne County, Missouri
Unincorporated communities in Missouri